Wu Ruiting (born 29 November 1995) is a Chinese athlete specialising in the triple jump. He represented his country at two consecutive World Championships, in 2017 and 2019, reaching the final on both occasions.

His personal bests in the event are 17.47 metres outdoors (+0.7 m/s, Shenyang 2019) and 16.94 metres indoors (Xianlin 2017).

International competitions

References

1995 births
Living people
Chinese male triple jumpers
World Athletics Championships athletes for China
Athletes (track and field) at the 2020 Summer Olympics
Olympic athletes of China